Jayashree is an Indian name. People with the name include:

M. Jayashree, Indian actress
B. Jayashree, Indian actress, director and singer
Jayashree (actress), Indian actress 
Jayashree Banerjee (born 1938), a leader of the Bharatiya Janata Party of India
Jayashree Patanekar, Hindustani classical vocalist
Jayashree Ramadas, Indian scientist

See also
Jayashri